The Black Heart Procession (occasionally spelled The Blackheart Procession) is an American indie rock band from San Diego, California.

Biography

Early years
The band was formed in 1997 by Pall Jenkins (Mr. Tube and the Flying Objects, Palllap, Ugly Casanova and Three Mile Pilot) and Tobias Nathaniel (Three Mile Pilot). The group is often augmented by the contributions of Matt Resovich, Mario Rubalcaba, Jason Crane, Joe Plummer, Dmitri Dziensuwski, Jimmy LaValle and Matthew Parker. Jenkins has also produced The Drowning Men.

Hiatus

Blackheart Procession’s last release, the Blood Bunny / Black Rabbit EP in 2010, the band went on hiatus.  Jenkins told San Diego City Beat that "[a]fter years of touring and traveling and focusing on music, we decided just to kind of put an end to it for a while".

In 2011,l Jenkins played optigan, piano and sang on J Mascis's album Several Shades of Why and then returned to play guitar and song on Mascis's 2014 album Tied to a Star.

Reformation
In 2016 Blackheart Procession reassembled for a pair of shows in San Diego. In December of that year, they announced a European tour, with 27 shows all around the continent during March–April 2017.

Discography
Albums: 
1, Headhunter Records (1998)
 2, Touch and Go Records (1999)
 Three, Touch and Go Records (2000)
 Amore Del Tropico, Touch and Go Records (2002)
 The Spell, Touch and Go Records (2006)
 The Waiter Chapters 1 - 7, SDRL Records (2008)
 Six, Temporary Residence (2009)

Singles and EPs:
 A Three Song Recording, (1997)
 Fish the Holes on Frozen Lakes, (1999)
 Between The Machines, Suicide Squeeze Records (2001)
 In the Fishtank 11 (with Solbakken), (2004)
 Hearts and Tanks, (2005)
 Blood Bunny / Black Rabbit, Temporary Residence (2010)

Compilation appearances:
 Slaying since 1996, Suicide Squeeze Records (2006) – track After The Ladder 
 Infamous 2: The Blue Soundtrack, Sumthing Else Music Works (2011) – track Fade Away
 Time & Space (Liz Janes covered), Asthmatic Kitty (2011) – track Martyr's Grind Up

References

External links

Temporary Residence on Bandcamp
Joe Wallace interviews Pall Jenkins for Gearwire.com regarding Black Heart Procession writing and recording techniques
Black Heart Procession collection at the Internet Archive's live music archive
2 Live videos at Intimepop.com

Suicide Squeeze Records artists
Indie rock musical groups from California
Musical groups from San Diego
Musical groups established in 1997
Touch and Go Records artists
Temporary Residence Limited artists